WHFI is a classic hits formatted broadcast radio station licensed to Lindside, West Virginia, serving Union and Monroe County, West Virginia.  WHFI is owned and operated by the Monroe County Board of Education.

Programming
Aside from its Classic Hits format, WHFI broadcasts sporting events for Monroe County's James Monroe High School.

Studios/Transmitter
WHFI's studios are located in the Monroe County Technical School in Lindside, with its tower located behind James Monroe High School also in Lindside.

External links

HFI